This is a list of imports who have played or currently playing in the Philippine Basketball Association.

F

G

H

I

J

More PBA imports lists
A–E  F–J  K–O  P–T  U–Z

References
Hardcourt: The Official Philippine Basketball Association Annual

External links
Official website
MYPBA.com
http://pba-online.net/teams/

F
F

tl:Talaan ng mga manlalaro ng Philippine Basketball Association